NGC 2346 is a planetary nebula near the celestial equator in the constellation of Monoceros, less than a degree to the ESE of Delta Monocerotis. It is informally known as the Butterfly Nebula. The nebula is bright and conspicuous with a visual magnitude of 9.6, and has been extensively studied. Among its most remarkable characteristics is its unusually cool central star, which is a spectroscopic binary, and its unusual shape.

The nebular is bipolar in form, with modest outflow velocities in the range of 8–11 km/s, while the center is girded by an expanding belt of molecular gas. The electron density of the nebula is on the order of 400 per cubic centimeter. The ionization of the nebula is the result of ultraviolet emission from the binary companion. The mass of the molecular gas in the nebula is estimated to be in the range of 0.34–, and is much greater than the mass of the ionized gas.

The central star is a binary star consisting of an A-type subgiant and a subdwarf O star. The system, which has an orbital period of  days, is also variable, probably due to dust in orbit around it. The dust itself is heated by the central star and so NGC 2346 is unusually bright in the infrared part of the spectrum. When one of the two stars evolved into a red giant, it engulfed its companion, which stripped away a ring of material from the larger star's atmosphere. When the red giant's core was exposed, a fast stellar wind inflated two ‘bubbles’ from either side of the ring.

Gallery

References

External links
 

Planetary nebulae
Spectroscopic binaries
Monoceros (constellation)
2346